The Palisades Interstate Park Commission (PIPC) was formed in 1900 by Governors Theodore Roosevelt of New York and Foster Voorhees of New Jersey in response to the quarrying operations along the Palisades Cliffs of New Jersey. The Palisades, a National Natural Landmark that are also called the New Jersey Palisades or the Hudson River Palisades, are a line of steep cliffs along the west side of the lower Hudson River in Northeastern New Jersey and Southeastern New York in the United States. After its formation, the PIPC quickly moved to acquire the lands at the base of the Palisades to stop quarrying operations in both New York and New Jersey. The commission consists of ten commissioners, five appointed by each governor, and was ratified by an Act of Congress in 1937 when its interstate compact was approved. Today, the Commission owns and operates more than 125,000 acres of public parkland in New York and New Jersey including 21 state parks, 8 historic sites, and the Palisades Interstate Parkway. These parks are visited by more than 7 million people annually.

History
In the late 1800s, quarry operations dotted the base of the Palisades Cliffs along the western shore of the Hudson River. These quarry operations sought the durable diabase rock that forms the Palisades to fuel the construction boom in nearby New York City. However, many of the residents of the area, including J.P. Morgan, saw the quarrying as a destruction of a valuable natural feature. There were many efforts to save the Palisades Cliffs, but the one that took root was led by the New Jersey State Federation of Women's Clubs. This group of influential women gathered together to lobby then Governors Theodore Roosevelt and Foster Voorhees to save the cliffs. Their work culminated in the creation of the Palisades Interstate Park Commission, which was given the power to condemn and/or purchase land in order to protect the Palisades and create a public park. 

Under the leadership of George W. Perkins, the Commission began to purchase, condemn, and shut down quarry operations along the base of the cliffs. The Commission worked quickly, preserving the land along the Hudson River between Fort Lee and the NY border. They then moved into New York State to Tallman Mountain, where quarrying was also taking place. Within a decade, the quarries were mostly closed down and the Palisades Interstate Park was opened. 

At the same time, the Commission was working to expand public open space in Rockland and Orange Counties, NY. At Bear Mountain, a gift of 10,000 acres and $1,000,000 by Mary W. Harriman led to the establishing of Bear Mountain and Harriman State Parks. Today, Bear Mountain receives over 2 million annual visitors and Harriman is the second largest state park in New York. These parks, and their development, served as models for the National Park System, are the location of the first established section of the Appalachian Trail, and host some of the first nature trails and environmental education programs in the nation.

Upon the creation of the New York State Office of Parks, Recreation, and Historic Preservation (OPRHP) in 1970, the Palisades Interstate Park Commission was given the authority to manage the Palisades Region of NY State Parks. Today, PIPC and OPRHP jointly manage the 125,000 acres of parkland in this region, which includes all state parklands in Rockland, Orange, Ulster, and Sullivan Counties, New York. The Palisades Interstate Park was designated a National Historic Landmark in 1965. The designated area includes the Palisades Park in New Jersey, the Palisades Park in New York State, and the Tallman Mountain State Park in New York State.

Major Welch 
In 1913, George Perkins hired Major William A. Welch as assistant engineer. He would later become Chief Engineer, working to implement Perkins' plans for the park and, upon Perkins' death in 1920, became the General Manager of the Palisades Interstate Park system. He held this position until his death in 1940. 

Under Welch's leadership, the Palisades Interstate Park grew exponentially, incorporating lands into what is now Harriman and Bear Mountain State Parks as well as at Blauvelt, Tallman Mountain, Nyack Beach, High Tor, and other parks in Rockland and Orange Counties. 

When work started on the park there were no models or precedents for an endeavor of its nature and scope. Welch organized a massive reforestation program, managed ten thousand Works Progress Administration and Civilian Conservation Corps workers, built twenty-three new lakes,  of scenic drives and one hundred and three children's camps, where 65,000 urban children enjoyed the outdoors each summer. He helped found the Palisades Interstate Park Trail Conference, which later became the New York–New Jersey Trail Conference, and he served as chairman of the Appalachian Trail Conference.

Palisades Interstate Parkway 
In 1933–34, the first thoughts of a Palisades Interstate Parkway were developed by engineer and environmentalist William A. Welch, who was general manager and chief engineer of the Palisades Interstate Park Commission. The plan was to build a parkway to connect the New Jersey Palisades with the state parks along the Hudson River in Rockland and Orange counties. Welch would soon garner the support of John D. Rockefeller, who donated 700 acres (2.8 km2) of land along the New Jersey Palisades overlooking the Hudson River in 1933. With this favorable momentum for the new route, the proposed route was accepted as a Civil Works Administration project under Franklin D. Roosevelt's New Deal coalition. However, the New Jersey Highway Commission did not support construction, so the idea of a parkway was put on hold.

During the 1940s, Rockefeller renewed the push for a parkway along the New Jersey Palisades, and teamed with ultimate PIP planner, Robert Moses, to establish and design the parkway. The plan originally was to have the PIP stretch from the Garden State Parkway, along the Hudson River, to the George Washington Bridge, and then north along its present-day route ending at the Bear Mountain Bridge. This southern extension was never built, but construction began on the current PIP in New York on April 1, 1947. Construction on the New Jersey portion began about one year later. Construction was delayed twice due to material shortages, but that did not stop the PIP from being opened in stages during the 1940s and 1950s. The route was completed in New Jersey in 1957, and on August 28, 1958, the final piece of the PIP was completed between exits 5 and 9 in southern Rockland County.

Current scope

The commission also oversees and operates the Palisades Interstate Parkway, built between 1947 and 1958. The commission also owns four additional parkways that traverse its parks, although two are partially or wholly maintained by the New York State Department of Transportation, while the rest are both owned and maintained by PIPC.

The Palisades Interstate Park in New Jersey is about 12 miles long and half a mile wide at its widest point, the average width of the facility is about 575 yards wide. It covers an area of 2,500 acres (3.9 sq.mi.). The park contains uplands, cliffs and the Hudson River shorefront. PIP has more than 30 miles of hiking and ski trails.

State parks

Historic sites

Parkways

See also
Palisades Interstate Parkway Police Department

References

Other sources
Myles, William J., Harriman Trails, A Guide and History, The New York-New Jersey Trail Conference, New York, N.Y., 1999.

External links

New Jersey Palisades
New Jersey Section of Palisades Interstate Park: Trail Details and Info

Parks in Bergen County, New Jersey
 
Ramapos
Rockland County, New York
Hudson River
National Historic Landmarks in New York (state)
National Historic Landmarks in New Jersey
National Register of Historic Places in Bergen County, New Jersey
National Register of Historic Places in Rockland County, New York
1900 establishments in New Jersey
1900 establishments in New York (state)
United States interstate compacts
Environmental agencies in New York (state)
Parks on the Hudson River